Hamelin Bay is a bay and a locality on the southwest coast of Western Australia between Cape Leeuwin and Cape Naturaliste.  It is named after French explorer Jacques Félix Emmanuel Hamelin, who sailed through the area in about 1801.  It is south of Cape Freycinet.

To the north, the beach leads to the Boranup Sand Patch and further to the mouth of the Margaret River, while south leads to Cape Leeuwin. The nearest locality to the east is Karridale on the Margaret River to Augusta road.

It was also a small settlement and port in Western Australia on the coast of the Leeuwin-Naturaliste Ridge.

Port and jetty

The jetty was established to service the timber milling operations of  Davies, at the same time as utilising a jetty at Flinders Bay just south of Augusta.  One of the Davies timber railways extended onto the Hamelin Bay Jetty, which was built in 1882 and extended in 1898.  Only a few piles of the original jetty remain on site.

Tourist attractions
The Cape to Cape Track runs across the beach to the west of the town, making Hamelin Bay one of the few settlements located along the track.

Camping area
Although most of the adjacent land is now vested in the Leeuwin-Naturaliste National Park, small amounts of land nearby are freehold.  In the 1950s the local camping area utilised the shells of a large number of decommissioned Perth trams.  None remain, and in addition to unpowered and powered camp sites there are now a small number of on-site cabins and a handful of chalets with modern facilities. A number of camp sites have been removed to accommodate these structures. A shop and ablution blocks are located within the camping area.

Due to the nature of the camping area and the local weather conditions there are frequently total fire bans in the camping area.

Wrecks
Hamelin Bay was difficult to navigate due to reefs and rocks in the vicinity.

Hamelin Bay was notorious for wrecks occurring during bad weather – its exposure to prevailing weather making it a dangerous location for anchoring or mooring.

Some fishing boats continue to utilize the anchorage when prevailing weather is not a problem.

The Western Australian Museum's database of wrecks includes numerous vessels that foundered in or near Hamelin Bay.  An anchor from one of the wrecks was retrieved and is now situated in the beach car park at Hamelin Bay.

The storm of 22 July 1900 was a serious event at Hamelin.

Wrecks include:
 Agincourt, 1863
 Arcadia, 25 April 1900 – wooden barque
 Aristide, 25 October 1889 – wooden barge
 Chaudiere, 4 July 1883 – barque
 Else (formerly Albert William), 2 September 1900 – barquentine
 Glenbervie, 20 June 1900
 Hokitika, 2 November 1872 – barque
 Katinka, 22 July 1900 – iron
 Lövspring, 22 July 1900 – wooden barque
 Nor'wester, 22 July 1900 – iron barque
 Tobar, 1945 – lugger
 SS Waterlily, 31 January 1903 – clinker built screw steamer

Whale strandings
Hamelin Bay and environs have been the site of a number of whale strandings, some of which are listed below:

 1996, 320 long-finned pilot whales, just north of the bay, in Western Australia's largest known stranding
 March 2018, over 150 short-finned pilot whales

Attempts to save the mammals have usually failed.

In addition to concerns for the animals themselves, the strandings are considered to increase the risk of shark attack, due to the attraction of the dead whales.

Light station 
A light station on nearby Hamelin Island was built in 1937.  In 1967 it was moved to the mainland, and is now known as Foul Bay Lighthouse.

Railway 

The M C Davies railway connected Hamelin Bay jetty with Karridale, Boranup, and Flinders Bay.

In 1925 the railway formations were incorporated into the connecting Flinders Bay Branch Railway.

Adjacent features also named after Hamelin
 Cape Hamelin
 Hamelin Island

References

Further reading
 Marchant, Leslie R. French Napoleonic Placenames of the South West Coast, Greenwood, Western Australia, R.I.C. Publications, 2004.  
 Edward Duyker François Péron: An Impetuous Life: Naturalist and Voyager, Miegunyah/MUP, Melbourne, 2006, 
 Fornasiero, Jean; Monteath, Peter and West-Sooby, John.  Encountering Terra Australis: the Australian voyages of Nicholas Baudin and Matthew Flinders, Kent Town, South Australia, Wakefield Press, 2004. 
Frank Horner, The French Reconnaissance: Baudin in Australia 1801—1803, Melbourne University Press, Melbourne, 1987 .
 Cape to Cape Walk Track – Section 5 – Hamelin Bay to Cape Leeuwin 29 km Pamphlet. CALM. Busselton. n.d.

 
Bays of Western Australia
Leeuwin-Naturaliste National Park
Cape to Cape Track